Jena Mai Hansen (born 10 December 1988) is a Danish sailor in the 49er FX and Musto Skiff classes. Together with Katja Salskov-Iversen she won a bronze medal at the 2016 Olympics.

In 2017-18, she was a crewmember on the yacht Vestas 11th Hour Racing on legs 2, 3, 8, 9, 10, 11 in the Volvo Ocean Race.

References

1988 births
Living people
Danish female sailors (sport)
Olympic bronze medalists for Denmark
Sailors at the 2016 Summer Olympics – 49er FX
Olympic sailors of Denmark
Olympic medalists in sailing
Medalists at the 2016 Summer Olympics
Volvo Ocean Race sailors